The March 74S is a Group 5 prototype race car, designed, developed and built by British manufacturer March Engineering, for sports car racing, in 1974.

References

Sports prototypes